Crystal River Preserve State Park is a Florida State Park, originally known as the Crystal River Buffer Preserve. The Preserve comprises 27,500 acres of salt marsh, tidal creeks, mangrove islands, hardwood forests, coastal scrub and pine flat woods.

The Crystal River Preserve is a remnant of the Florida coastline that has changed little since the Europeans arrived more than 500 years ago. It is located in a transitional area from a temperate and sub-tropical climate zone and contains plants and animals from both regions. The preserve follows 20 miles (30 kilometres) of coastline along the Gulf of Mexico from Crystal River though Ozello to Homosassa. The Crystal River Archaeological State Park is located within the park boundary and managed by the Crystal River Preserve State Park.

The primary recreational opportunities at the Preserve are hiking, biking (including a 7-mile trail), birding, kayaking, fishing (freshwater, near shore, and saltwater) and nature observation. Crystal River, which provides refuge to wintering manatees, is located 3 miles southeast of the main park entrance.

References

Crystal River Preserve State Park Online. January 11, 2006.
Crystal River State Archaeological Site - Online. January 11, 2006.

Gallery

State parks of Florida
Parks in Citrus County, Florida
Crystal River, Florida